Anton Yevgenievich Megerdichev (born July 22, 1969)  is a Russian director and screenwriter.

Filmography
 Russian Empire. The Project of Leonid Parfyonov (2000)
 Shadowboxing 2: Revenge (2007)
 Dark World (2010)
 Metro (2013)
 Yolki 3 (2013)
 Going Vertical (2017)
 Land of Legends (2022)

References

External links

Living people
1969 births
Russian film directors
Russian screenwriters
Russian documentary filmmakers